Henry Thomas Joynt Thacker (20 March 1870 – 3 May 1939) was a doctor, New Zealand Member of Parliament and Mayor of Christchurch.

Early life
Thacker was born in Okains Bay on Banks Peninsula on 20 March 1870. His parents were Essy Joynt and John Edward Thacker. His father was an editor of the Sligo Guardian and after emigration to Christchurch in 1850, launched the second newspaper in Canterbury, the Guardian and Canterbury Advertiser. The newspaper failed after only a few months.

Henry Thacker attended Boys' High School and then Canterbury College (what is now known as the University of Canterbury), from where he graduated with a Bachelor of Arts. He then enrolled at University of Edinburgh where he gained his M.B. and C.M. diplomas in 1895. Two years later he gained a fellowship in the Royal College of Surgeons in Dublin.

Return to New Zealand
Thacker returned to Christchurch in 1898 and opened a practice in Latimer Square. He represented Canterbury in rugby union in 1889 and 1891 and assisted in the development of Richard Arnst. From 1899 he held the rank of captain in the Army Medical Corps.

Rugby league
Thacker was the first president of the Canterbury Rugby Football League when the organisation began holding competitions in 1913. He served in this position from 1912 until 1929 and became a life member in 1920. Thacker also donated the Thacker Shield in 1913. He was the manager of the New Zealand side during their tour of Australia in 1913.

Political career
Thacker was a member of the Christchurch Hospital Board (1907–1922), Lyttelton Harbour Board (1907–1922), Christchurch City Council (1929–1931) and Mayor of Christchurch between 1919 and 1923. The 1919 mayoral election was contested by Thacker, John Joseph Dougall (Mayor of Christchurch 1911–1912) and James McCombs (MP for Lyttelton).

He then contested the Lyttelton by-election in 1913 as an independent Liberal, coming fourth with 5% of the vote in the first ballot.

Thacker was a member of the Liberal Party and represented the Christchurch East electorate in the New Zealand House of Representatives from 1914. He was re-elected in 1919 but was defeated in 1922 by Tim Armstrong from the Labour Party, when he came second out of three candidates.

In 1935, he was awarded the King George V Silver Jubilee Medal.

Death
Thacker died on 3 May 1939 at Christchurch. His wife died in 1955, and they are both buried at Waimairi Cemetery. The Thackers had no children.

References

|-

1870 births
1939 deaths
People educated at Christchurch Boys' High School
Mayors of Christchurch
Deputy mayors of Christchurch
New Zealand Liberal Party MPs
New Zealand hospital administrators
University of Canterbury alumni
Alumni of the University of Edinburgh
New Zealand rugby league administrators
New Zealand MPs for Christchurch electorates
Burials at Waimairi Cemetery
Christchurch City Councillors
Unsuccessful candidates in the 1908 New Zealand general election
Unsuccessful candidates in the 1911 New Zealand general election
Unsuccessful candidates in the 1922 New Zealand general election
Unsuccessful candidates in the 1925 New Zealand general election
New Zealand general practitioners
New Zealand military doctors
Lyttelton Harbour Board members